Mother and Son is an Australian television sitcom.

Mother and Son may also refer to:
 Mother and Son (1931 film), a 1931 film directed by John P. McCarthy
 Mother and Son (1997 film), a 1997 Russian film
 Mother and Son (2022 film), a 2022 French film
 "Mother and Son" (Dynasty), a 1982 episode of the American TV series Dynasty
 Mother and Son, a 1955 novel by Ivy Compton-Burnett
 "Mother and Son", the seventh episode of the seventh season of Hawaii Five-0